Poghos Bek-Pirumyan (8 June 1856 – 19 January 1921) was an Armenian military commander. He served as a colonel for the Russian Empire in World War I and was a commander of the Battle of Sardarabad.

Biography

Poghos Bek-Pirumyan was born on 8 June 1856 in Nakhichevanik village of the Shusha uezd of the Elizavetpol Governorate within the Russian Empire. He is the cousin of Daniel Bek-Pirumian. Poghos graduated from the high school in Shusha, then attended cadet school, and joined the Imperial Russian Army in 1878. He held several positions of battalion and regiment commander, and participated in both the Russo-Turkish War of 1877–78 and the Russo-Japanese War of 1904–05. In 1914, Bek-Pirumyan retired, but came out of retirement that same year with the outbreak of World War I. Bek-Pirumyan fought on the Western Front, and then in the Caucasus Campaign. Since 1916, he was the commander of the 5th Armenian Rifle Regiment, which participated in the battles of Van and Mush.

At the Battle of Sardarabad in 1918, the 5th Regiment was a reserve guerrilla unit and a special cavalry regiment. His cousin, Daniel Bek-Pirumyan, also participated in the battle as a commander-in-chief. Armenian general Movses Silikyan ordered elements of the 5th Armenian Regiment under Bek-Pirumyan to check the advance of the Ottoman army. An offensive was launched on May 22 and the Armenian forces were successful in halting the Ottomans in their tracks and forcing Yakub Shevki Pasha's forces into a general rout, retreating nearly 15-20 kilometers in a westerly direction. The Ottoman command, however, was able to recuperate from its losses and reorganized its forces near the mountain heights on the north-west bank of the Araks river. Repeated attempts to cross the river were met with fierce resistance by the 5th Armenian Regiment. On May 24, several more skirmishes took place between the Armenian and Ottoman forces. The battle came to end on May 29, with a decisive Armenian victory

After Sovietization of Armenia in December 1920, about 1,000 officers of the First Republic of Armenia were arrested by the Bolshevik authorities, and were forced to walk from Yerevan to Alaverdi by foot (about 160 kilometers). Some of them were killed on the road. In January 1921, many heroes of the Battle of Sardarabad were shot, including Daniel Bek-Pirumyan. Poghos Bek-Pirumyan committed suicide on 19 January 1921 after being tortured. These events soon led to the February Uprising.

Personal life
Bek-Pirumyan married his wife Catherine in 1892, and they had three children: Alexander (b. 1893), Tamara (b. 1897), and Michael (b. 1899).

His cousin, Daniel Bek-Pirumian, was also a colonel who fought in many of the same battles as Poghos, including the Battle of Sardarabad.

Awards
 Order of Saint Stanislaus, 3rd class (1881)
 Order of St. Anna, 4th class (1882)
 Order of St. Anna, 3rd class (1882)
 Order of Saint Stanislaus, 2nd class (1901)
 Order of St. Vladimir, 4th class (1904)
 Order of St. George, 3rd class (1908)
 Order of St. Anna, 2nd class (1909)
 Order of St. Vladimir, 3rd class (1916)
 Gold Sword for Bravery
 Medal "For the capture of Geok-Tepe" (1881)
 Order of the Lion and the Sun, 3rd class

References

External links

Outstanding people of Karabagh 
Genocide.ru 
Hayazg.info 

1856 births
1921 deaths
People from Khojaly District
Imperial Russian Army personnel
Russian military personnel of World War I
Armenian colonels
Armenian people of World War I
People of the First Republic of Armenia
Recipients of the Order of Saint Stanislaus (Russian), 2nd class
Recipients of the Order of St. Anna
Recipients of the Order of St. Vladimir, 3rd class
Recipients of the Order of St. George of the Third Degree
Recipients of the Gold Sword for Bravery
Armenian military personnel who committed suicide